The 1981–82 Marquette Warriors men's basketball team represented the Marquette University in the 1981–82 season. The Warriors finished the regular season with a record of 23–9. As a 7 seed, the Warriors defeated the 10 seed Evansville in the first round, 67–62. Marquette would fall to Missouri in the second round.

Roster

Schedule

Team players drafted into the NBA

External links
MUScoop's MUWiki

References 

Marquette Golden Eagles men's basketball seasons
Marq
Marq
Marquette
Marquette